Murong Huang (297–348), courtesy name Yuanzhen (元真), formally Prince Wenming of (Former) Yan ((前)燕文明王) was the founding monarch of the Xianbei-led Former Yan dynasty of China. When he first succeeded his father Murong Hui in 333, he carried the Jin dynasty-bestowed title Duke of Liaodong, but in 337 claimed the title of Prince of Yan, which is traditionally viewed as the founding date of Former Yan. (Emperor Cheng of Jin did retroactively recognize Murong Huang's princely title in 341 after much debate among Jin officials.)  After his son Murong Jun completely broke away from Jin and claimed the title of emperor in 353, he was posthumously honored as Emperor Wenming of (Former) Yan with the temple name Taizu (太祖). In the Book of Jin, Murong Huang was described as a strong looking tall man (approximately 1.91 metres).

Early life
Murong Huang's father Murong Hui had initially been a Xianbei chief who fought Jin forces during the late reign of Emperor Wu of Jin, Jin's founding emperor, but he submitted as a Jin vassal in 289.  Under constant attack by fellow Xianbei chief Duan Jie (段階) of the Duan tribe, he humbly sought peace with the Duan and married one of Duan Jie's daughters.  From this union came Murong Huang (in 297) and two of his younger brothers, Murong Ren (慕容仁) and Murong Zhao (慕容昭).

During Murong Hui's rule as tribal chief, the Jin dynasty's central government was in constant turmoil and eventually collapsed due to infighting and agrarian rebellions, the strongest of which was the Xiongnu state Han Zhao. As a result, many refugees arrived in the relatively safe domain of Murong Hui's, and as he treated the ethnically Han refugees with kindness, most chose to stay, greatly strengthening his power, and as Jin forces in the north gradually fell to Han Zhao's capable general Shi Le (who later established his own independent state Later Zhao), Murong Hui became the only domain in northern China still under titular Jin rule, carrying the Jin-bestowed title of the Duke of Liaodong.  He entrusted Murong Huang with many important military tasks.  These included fighting the powerful fellow Xianbei Yuwen tribe in 320 and 325. In early 322, Murong Hui named Murong Huang heir apparent.  However, Murong Hui also greatly favored Murong Huang's brothers Murong Ren, Murong Zhao, and particularly Murong Han (慕容翰), who was regarded very highly as a general.  Murong Huang became jealous and suspicious of these brothers, feelings which became known to them and which would sow the seeds of future troubles.

As Duke of Liaodong
In 333, Murong Hui died.  Murong Huang took over his administration under the Jin-bestowed office of General Pingbei (平北將軍) and sent messengers to report his father's death to Emperor Cheng of Jin and request commission official for himself.  Soon after, with Jin commission expected but not yet arrived, he claimed the title of Duke of Liaodong, which his father had carried.

Murong Huang carried out strict and harsh enforcement of laws and regulations, which unsettled some of his subordinates. His suspicions of Murong Han, Murong Ren, and Murong Zhao also became clear. Murong Han, in fear, fled to the Duan tribe (Dukedom of Liaoxi) and became a general for the Duan chief Duan Liao (段遼). Murong Ren and Murong Zhao conspired to have Murong Ren attack the capital Jicheng (棘城, in modern Jinzhou, Liaoning) from his defense post of Pingguo (平郭, in modern Yingkou, Liaoning) and for Murong Zhao to rise within Jicheng to join him, ready to divide the dukedom if they succeeded.  Murong Ren soon launched a surprise attack, but scouts by Murong Huang discovered the attack and readied for the attack, so Murong Ren instead captured the cities in the eastern dukedom (Liaodong Peninsula). Forces that Murong Huang sent to attack him were repelled, and Murong Ren claimed for himself the Duke of Liaodong title as well. Jin messengers sent to bestow on Murong Huang the same titles his father had were intercepted and detained by Murong Ren.

Also in 334, Duan forces, under the commands of Murong Han and Duan Liao's brother Duan Lan (段蘭) attacked Liucheng (柳城, in modern Zhaoyang, Liaoning), and Murong Huang's forces sent to relieve Liucheng suffered a great defeat at Duan forces' hands. Duan Lan wanted to further advance on Jicheng, but Murong Han, fearful that his own tribe would be destroyed, ordered a withdrawal. (While his comments were intended to force Duan Lan to agree to a withdrawal, Murong Han's comments at this time stating that Murong Huang was "false and treacherous" may indicate what his true feelings about Murong Huang were.)

In early 336, Murong Huang made a daring surprise attack, personally leading his army by a route that Murong Ren did not expect—over the frozen Bohai—arriving at Pingguo. Murong Ren, not realizing that it was a major attack, came out of the city to fight Murong Huang, who defeated and captured him, forcing him to commit suicide.

As Prince of Yan
In 337, Murong Huang claimed for himself the title of Prince of Yan—a title that Jin had previously considered but declined to confer on his father Murong Hui.  This is commonly viewed as the founding of Former Yan, particularly because he also set up a governmental structure mirroring Jin's imperial government, albeit with different office titles intentionally showing inferiority to Jin.

That same year, Murong Huang, countering his father's prior policy of having no contact at all with Jin's rival Later Zhao, sent messengers to Later Zhao promising to be a vassal and requesting a joint attack against the Duan.  Later Zhao's emperor Shi Hu was very pleased, and they agreed on an attack in 338.  In the spring, they launched the attacks.  Murong Huang quickly attacked and pillaged the Duan cities north of its capital Lingzhi (令支, in modern Tangshan, Hebei), defeating Duan Lan's forces.  He then withdrew, and when Later Zhao forces arrived, Duan Liao no longer dared to face them but instead abandoned Lingzhi and fled.  Lingzhi surrendered to Later Zhao.  Shi Hu was happy about the victory but angry that Murong Huang withdrew before the armies could meet, and he decided to turn his armies against Murong Huang instead.  With Later Zhao's massive armies arriving in Former Yan territory, nearly all of the cities submitted to Later Zhao except the capital Jicheng.  Murong Huang considered fleeing, but under advice of his general Muyu Gen, he stayed and defended the city for nearly 20 days, and Later Zhao forces were forced to withdraw; Murong Huang then sent his son Murong Ke to attack the retreating Later Zhao troops, scoring a great victory, and the only Later Zhao force remaining intact was that of Shi Min, Shi Hu's adopted grandson.  After Later Zhao's withdrawal, Murong Huang recaptured the cities that had rebelled.  He also took over cities formerly ruled by the Duan, extending into modern northern Hebei.  In early 339, after Duan Liao sent conflicting requests to Later Zhao and Former Yan, requesting surrender, the Later Zhao and Former Yan forces engaged, and Murong Ke again won a great victory over Later Zhao.  Murong Huang honored Duan Liao as a guest and merged Duan's remaining forces into his own. Later that year, however, Duan planned a rebellion and was killed by Murong Huang. (However, the Duan clan was not wiped out, and many members of the Duan clan later served as generals, officials, and imperial consorts of the Murongs.) From this point on, Former Yan forces would conduct yearly raids against Later Zhao's border region. They would also periodically attack the Yuwen tribe and Goguryeo.

Also in 339, Murong Huang married his sister to Tuoba Shiyijian, the Prince of Dai, cementing an alliance between the two Xianbei powers.  (The two would, however, engage in occasional battles after Princess Murong's death in 342.)  He also sent messengers to the Jin capital to formally request from Emperor Cheng the Prince of Yan title—explaining that he needed it to increase his authority over the people but that he was still loyal to Jin.  In 341, after several months of debate, Emperor Cheng decided to grant Murong Huang the princely title.

In 340, Murong Han, who had fled to the Yuwen after the Duan were defeated but who had subsequently been mistrusted and mistreated by the Yuwen, agreed to return under Murong Huang's command, and he fled back to Liaodong.  Murong Huang gave him a military command.

In 341, Murong Huang moved his capital from Jicheng to a newly built city, Longcheng (龍城, in modern Zhaoyang, Liaoning).

In 344, Murong Huang, with Murong Han as his deputy, attacked Yuwen, greatly defeating it and forcing its chief Yuwen Yidougui (宇文逸豆歸) to flee.  The Former Yan forces forcibly moved the Yuwen tribe south and merged them into Former Yan's own population.  Later that year, Murong Huang, still apprehensive of Murong Han's abilities, forced him to commit suicide.

In 345, Murong Huang stopped using Jin's era names—which is viewed by some as the sign of Former Yan's formal independence.

In 348, Murong Huang grew ill and died.  He was succeeded by his son Murong Jun.

Era name
 Yanwang ("Prince of Yan") (燕王 yàn wáng) 337–348

Personal information
 Father
 Murong Hui (慕容廆), Xianbei chief and Duke Xiang of Liaodong, posthumously honored as Prince Wuxuan of Yan
 Mother
 Duchess Duan, Murong Hui's wife, daughter of the Duan chief Duan Jie (段階)
 Wife
 Princess Duan (created 337)
 Major Concubines
 Consort Gao, mother of Prince Ke
 Consort Lan, mother of Prince Ba
 Consort Gongsun, mother of Princes Na and De
 Children
 Murong Jun (慕容儁), the heir apparent, later Emperor Jingzhao
 Murong Ke (慕容恪), Prince Huan of Taiyuan (created 354)
 Murong Ba (慕容霸), later renamed Murong Chui (慕容垂), the Prince of Wu (created 354), later Emperor Chengwu of Later Yan
 Murong You (慕容友), the Prince of Fanyang (created 354)
 Murong Li (慕容厲), the Prince of Xiapei (created 354)
 Murong Du (慕容度), the Prince of Lelang (created 354)
 Murong Yi (慕容宜), the Prince of Lujiang (created 354)
 Murong Huan (慕容桓), the Prince of Yidu (created 354, killed by Former Qin forces 370)
 Murong Dai (慕容逮), the Prince of Linhe (created 354)
 Murong Hui (慕容徽), the Prince of Hejian (created 354)
 Murong Long (慕容龍), the Prince of Liyang (created 354)
 Murong Na (慕容納), the Prince of Beihai (created 354)
 Murong Xiu (慕容秀), the Prince of Lanling (created 354)
 Murong Yue (慕容岳), the Prince of Anfeng (created 354)
 Murong De (慕容德), initially the Duke of Liang (created 354), later the Prince of Fanyang, later Emperor Xianwu of Southern Yan
 Murong Mo (慕容默), the Duke of Shi'an (created 354)
 Murong Lou (慕容僂), the Duke of Nankang (created 354)
 Murong Yu (慕容宇)
 Murong Zhou (慕容宙), Prince of Zhangwu, later Prince Wei of Lelang, killed by rebels led by Duan Sugu 398
 Princess Murong, married Tuoba Shiyijian, posthumously honored as Empress Zhaocheng

References

4th-century Chinese monarchs
Former Yan emperors
Jin dynasty (266–420) generals
297 births
348 deaths
People from Chaoyang, Liaoning
Generals from Liaoning
Jin dynasty (266–420) politicians
Politicians from Liaoning
Founding monarchs